The 2001–02 Divizia D was the 60th season of the Liga IV, the fourth tier of the Romanian football league system. The champions of each county association play against one from a neighboring county in a play-off match played on a neutral venue. The winners of the play-off matches promoted to Divizia C.

Promotion play-off

The matches was scheduled to be played on 8 June 2002.

|}

County leagues

Galați County

Harghita County 

Championship play-off 
The teams carried all records from the Regular season.

Mureș County 

Championship play-off

Neamț County

See also 
 2001–02 Divizia A
 2001–02 Divizia B

References

External links
 FRF

Liga IV seasons
4
Romania